The American Agriculture Movement is an organization consisting primarily of small American farmers. It was formed in 1977 in Campo, Colorado, by a group of farmers. They attempted to organize a strike in which farmers would no longer buy or sell anything.

Goals
The organization demanded for the federal government to establish higher prices of various crops and claimed to need "parity" between what they had to spend to grow crops versus revenues received from their crops.  One of the slogans of the group was "Parity not Charity," as the farmers demanded for the government to ensure that they were paid more for their crops. The farmers demanded to make as much profit per acre, adjusted for inflation, as farmers did at the turn of the 20th century.

Protest

On December 10, 1977, approximately 5,000 farmers held a rally in Lincoln, Nebraska, and were joined by Nebraska Governor J. James Exon. The farmers all rode their tractors, and soon other farm states had tractor rallies. Gloria Carter Spann, a sister of President Jimmy Carter even participated in one rally.

While the farmers appeared to have widespread sympathy, relatively few farmers actually went on strike and refused to grow crops. The organization therefore decided to have a tractor rally in Washington, DC. The Carter administration agreed that the Farmers Home Administration would stop all foreclosures, but soon after the rally had ended, it resumed foreclosures of farms with past due loans.

In 1979, the farmers again drove their tractors to Washington, drove on the National Mall, and blocked traffic, which caused significant tie-ups.

One of the tractors driven to Washington can be seen in the Smithsonian Museum in Washington.

Legacy
The American Agriculture Movement continues to lobby for changes in US farm policy. Its stated goals are as follows:

1. 100% Parity for all domestic and foreign used and/or consumer agriculture products.

2. All agricultural products produced for national or international food reserve shall be contracted at 100% parity.

3. Creation of an entity or structure composed of agriculture producers to advise and approve policies that affect agriculture.

4. Imports of agriculture products which are domestically produced must be stopped until 100% parity is reached.  Thereafter, imports must be limited to the amount that the American producers cannot supply.

5. All announcements pertaining to any agricultural producing cycle shall be made far enough in advance that the producer will have adequate time to make needed adjustments in his operation

The current sitting president (2015) is Larry Matlack of Rural Burrton, Kansas.

References

External links 
 Homepage
 Farming Crisis of the 1970′s and 1980′s in the Plains States

Agricultural organizations based in the United States